The Story Professor of Law is the official title of the Chair at Harvard Law School, and it is named for Joseph Story. The current Story Professor of Law is Richard H. Fallon Jr.

References 

Harvard University
Harvard Law School
Professorships in law